The  (term used in South Korea), also called  is traditional Korean clothing. It is worn not only by South and North Korea, but also by the joseon-jok (Korean-Chinese), a minority group in China. The term   literally means “Korean clothing.” Hanbok is also depicted in detail on murals from the Goguryeo period in Korea. Since the 1990s, the South Korean-style and the North Korean-style have been looking more and more similar to each other. Similarly, since the Chinese economic reform of China, there have been more exchanges with both Koreas leading to both the development and changes in joseonjok-style  in China; some of designs of the joseonjok-style  have been influenced and inspired by both South-Korean and North Korean  designs. 

These basic structural features of the  remains relatively unchanged to this day. However, present-day , which is worn nowadays, is patterned after the  worn in the Joseon dynasty, especially those worn by the nobility and royalty. The extensive use of white clothing among the commoners lead to Korea being referred as "dressed people of white". Nowadays, contemporary Koreans wear  for formal or semi-formal occasions and events such as weddings, festivals, celebrations, and ceremonies.

Etymology 
The first recorded evidence of the name  is from an 1881 document 《》. In the document,  was used to distinguish Korean clothing from Japanese traditional clothing and Western clothing.  was used in an 1895 document describing the assassination of Empress Myeongseong to distinguish Korean clothing from Japanese clothing. The origin of the name remains unclear, because these documents predate the Korean Empire which popularized the hanja character .

Hanbok was used in a 1905 newspaper article, which described the righteous army wearing Korean clothing. After the March 1st Movement, hanbok became a significant ethnic symbol of Koreans.

Influenced by rising nationalism in the 1900s,  became a word that meant the unique Korean clothing that can be distinguished from that of foreigners, such as Japanese, Western, and Chinese clothing. , which was more popular in the north, replaced the other words in North Korea after the division of Korea.

Construction and design

On top of this ensemble, there are also a variety of vests, jackets and coats. For women, there are Jang-sam, Dan-sam, Won-sam, and more.

It covers the arms and upper part of the wearer's body. The basic form of a  consists of gil, git, dongjeong, goreum and sleeves. Gil (Hangul: 길) is the large section of the garment on both front and back sides, and git (Hangul: 깃) is a band of fabric that trims the collar. Dongjeong (Hangul: 동정) is a removable white collar placed over the end of the git and is generally squared off. Women's  may have kkeutdong (Hangul: 끝동), a different colored cuff placed at the end of the sleeves. There are two  artifacts that may be the earliest surviving archaeological artifact. One from a Yangcheon Heo clan tomb is dated 1400–1450, while the other was discovered inside a statue of the Buddha at Sangwonsa Temple (presumably left as an offering) that has been dated to the 1460s.

The form of  has changed over time. While men's  remained relatively unchanged, women's  became dramatically shortened during the latter half of the Joseon dynasty, reaching its shortest length at the late 19th century. However, due to reformation efforts and practical reasons, late modern jeogori for women was longer than its earlier counterpart with its length still above the waistline There are various styles and types of  varying in fabric, sewing technique, and shape. Contemporary  are presently designed with various lengths.

Hobok characteristics of the ancient jeogori include: the closure on the front closing to the left side in Jwa-im (左袵, 좌임), narrow sleeves, and both men and women wearing trousers, even under chima. There is also Hanbok that was influenced by a more tropical style in Southern parts of the Korean Peninsula which lacked trousers and had a one-piece style.

Most modern  is closed to the right which is a fashion trend from what is now mainland China.

Goreum 
Traditionally, there are many types of goreum. Goreum refers to strings of cloth that fasten clothes together. Fabric goreum were potentially used since Gojoseon. They were originally practical but often decorative. Silla had regulations against types of Dae (belts) and decorative goreum for each Golpoom. Southern parts of Korea, including Silla, had a colorful goreum on the front of the neck, which influenced Yayoi culture. Parts of Goguryeo style had a fabric goreum loop around the waist with a decorative ribbon to the side like a belt. Generally, thin and short ones were used on the inside and more decorative, colourful ones were used on the outside. Since the early form of the jeogori was usually wrapped across the front, the outside goreum was placed on the side of the wearer, below the armpit. Starting in Joseon Dynasty, the goreum slowly moved to the front of the jeogori. In the 20th century, the goreum became the commonly known long and wide decorative ribbons on the front of the jeogori and was coined the Ot-goreum.

Danchu 
Other than fabric strings, danchu (buttons) were also used. There are many types of danchu. One example is the Maedeup-danchu which were often used to keep symmetrical collars together in the front and used for practical uses on military uniforms and court uniforms. They have long horizontal lines on either side like Manchurian buttons or looked like a ball and lasso. Magoja-danchu are often big decorative metal, gems or stones buttons usually on Jokki (vest).

Chima
Chima refers to "skirt", and is also called sang or gun in hanja. The underskirt, or petticoat layer, is called sokchima. Chima-malgi is the waistband that trims the top of the chima. From Goguryeo to Joseon period, various styles of chima existed such as striped, pleated, patchworked, and gored skirts. Chima were typically made from rectangular panels that were pleated or gathered into the chima-malgi (waistband). This waistband also had goreum strings for fastening the skirt around the body.

Goguryeo 
According to the murals of Goguryeo and an earthen toy excavated from the neighbourhood of Hwangnam-dong, Gyeongju, Goguryeo women usually wore the jeogori over the chima, covering the top of the chima. One popular fashion was the A-line chima.

Goryeo 
Variety of chima was worn during the Goryeo dynasty.

Joseon 
Variety of chima was worn during the Joseon dynasty.

Late modern period 
Sokchima was largely made in a traditional way until the early 20th century when shoulder straps were added, later developing into a sleeveless bodice or "reformed" petticoat called Eo-Kkeh-Heo-ri-Chima. By the mid-20th century, some outer chima also gained a sleeveless bodice, which was then covered by the jeogori.

Baji
Baji refers to the bottom part of the men's hanbok. It is the formal term for "trousers" in Korean. Compared to western style pants, baji does not fit tightly. The roomy design is aimed at making the clothing ideal for sitting on the floor and an ethnic style that dates back to the Three kingdoms period. It functions as modern trousers do and the term baji is commonly used in Korea to refer to every kind of pants.

The baji-malgi is a waistband of the baji that has a long string of goreum.

Baji can be unlined trousers, leather trousers, silk pants, or cotton pants, depending on style of dress, sewing method, embroidery and so on.

Po
Po is a generic term referring to an outer robe or overcoat. There are two general types of po, the Korean type and the Chinese type.

The Korean type is a common style from the Three Kingdoms of Korea period, and it is used in the modern day. There were many ways to fasten the coat but mainly a belt was used in conjunction with a ribbon goreum until the ribbon goreum became mainstream during late Joseon dynasty. Durumagi is a type of po that was worn for protection against the cold. It has been widely worn as an outer robe over jeogori and baji. It is also called jumagui, juchaui, or juui.

The Chinese type consist of different types of po from mainland China. Starting from the North–South states period, they were mainly adopted as court uniforms that localized into Korean culture throughout history. In 1895, there was a nation-wide adoption of the Korean type durumagi to regulate clothes and luxury items.

Deot-ot 
Deot-ot refers to a category of outer layers worn on top of the jeogori. Po also falls under this category. There are many varieties other than the ones listed here.

Banbi 
Banbi (Chinese: 半臂 bàn bì, literally “half sleeve”) are a type Hanfu that originated from the Tang Dynasty. Banbi refers to variety of short sleeved garments  worn on top of inner garments, typically the Yuanling pao (Chinese: 圓領袍， “round collar robe”). Numerous outer half-sleeved Banbi can be seen in ancient Tang-era paintings, murals, and statues.

Bigap 
A sleeveless outer garment that was derived from Mongolian clothing worn during the Goryeo period.

Baeja and Kwaeja 
Baeja refers to sleeveless outer garments that are worn on top of inner garments. It can be different lengths, short to long. Kwaeja is interchangeable with Baeja, but Kwaeja often refers to men's clothing.

Dapho 
The dapho is a short sleeved men's outer garment, often part of military uniform or official uniform.

Jokki 
Jokki is a type of vest, while magoja is an outer jacket. The jokki was created around late Joseon dynasty, as Western culture began to affect Korea.

Magoja 
Magoja was originally styled after the clothing of the Manchu people, and was introduced to Korea after Heungseon Daewongun, the father of King Gojong, returned from his political exile in Tianjin in 1887. Long sleeved Magoja were derived from the magwae he wore in exile because of the cold climate there. Owing to its warmth and ease of wear, magoja became popular in Korea. It is also called "deot jeogori" (literally "an outer jeogori") or magwae.

Magoja does not have a git, the band of fabric trimming the collar. Magoja was originally a male garment but later became unisex. The magoja for men sometimes has seop (overlapped column on the front) and is longer than women's magoja, with both sides open at the bottom. A magoja can be made of silk and often adorned with danchu which are usually made from amber. In men's magoja, buttons are attached to the right side, as opposed to the left as in women's magoja.

Children's hanbok

Traditionally, Kkachi durumagi (literally "a magpie's overcoat") were worn as seolbim (Hangul: 설빔), new clothing and shoes worn on the Korean celebration of Korean New Year,, while at present, it is worn as a ceremonial garment for dol, the celebration for a baby's first birthday. It is a children's colorful overcoat. It was worn mostly by young boys. The clothes is also called obangjang durumagi which means "an overcoat of five directions". It was worn over jeogori (a jacket) and jokki (a vest), while the wearer could put jeonbok (a long vest) over it. Kkachi durumagi was also worn along with headgear such as bokgeon (a peaked cloth hat), hogeon (peaked cloth hat with a tiger pattern) for young boys or gulle (decorative headgear) for young girls.

Foreign influences in design 

The cultural exchange was also bilateral and Goryeo hanbok had cultural influence on some clothing of Yuan dynasty worn by the upper class (i.e. the clothing worn by Mongol royal women's clothing and in the Yuan imperial court). Commoners were less influenced by these foreign fashion trends, and mainly wore a style of indigenous clothing distinct from that of the upper classes.

Occasions 

Hanbok is classified according to its purposes: everyday dress, ceremonial dress, and special dress. Ceremonial dresses are worn on formal occasions, including a child's first birthday, a wedding, or a funeral. Special dresses are made for shamans and officials.

Hanbok was worn daily up until just 100 years ago, it was originally designed to facilitate ease of movement. But now, it is only worn on festive occasions or special anniversaries. It is a formal dress and most Koreans keep a hanbok for special times in their life such as wedding, Chuseok (Korean Thanksgiving), and Seollnal (Korean New Year's), Children wear hanbok during their first birthday celebration (Hangul: 돌잔치) etc. While the traditional hanbok was beautiful in its own right, the design has changed slowly over the generations. The core of hanbok is its graceful shape and vibrant colors, it is hard to think of hanbok as everyday wear but it is slowly being revolutionized through the changing of fabrics, colors and features, reflecting the desire of people.

Women's traditional  consist of jeogori, which is a type of jacket, and chima, which is a wrap around skirt that is usually worn with a petticoat underneath. A man's hanbok consists of jeogori (jacket) and baggy pants that are called baji. There are also additional outer layers, such as the Po which is an outer coat, or robe, jokki which is a type of vest and magoja which is an outer jacket worn over jeogori for warmth and style.

The color of hanbok symbolized social position and marital status. Bright colors, for example, were generally worn by children and girls, and muted hues by middle aged men and women. Unmarried women often wore yellow jeogori and red chima while matrons wore green and red, and women with sons donned navy. The upper classes wore a variety of colours. Contrastingly, commoners were required to wear white, but dressed in shades of pale pink, light green, gray and charcoal on special occasions.
 
Also, the status and position can be identified by the material of the hanbok. The upper classes dressed in hanbok of closely woven ramie cloth or other high grade lightweight materials in warmer months and of plain and patterned silks throughout the remainder of the year. Commoners, in contrast, were restricted to cotton. Patterns were embroidered on hanbok to represent the wishes of the wearer. Peonies on a wedding dress, represented a wish for honor and wealth. Lotus flowers symbolized a hope for nobility, and bats and pomegranates showed the desire for children. Dragons, phoenixes, cranes and tigers were only for royalty and high-ranking officials.

History

Three Kingdoms of Korea 

The earliest visual depictions of  can be traced back to the Three Kingdoms of Korea period (57 BC to 668 AD). The origin of ancient  can be found in the ancient clothing of what is now today's Northern Korea and Manchuria. Reflecting its nomadic origins in western and northern Asia, ancient  shared structural similarities with hobok type clothing of the nomadic cultures in East Asia, designed to facilitate horse-riding and ease of movement, such as the use of trousers and jacket for male clothing and the use of left closure in its jacket. However, although the ancient  reflects some similarity with the Scythian clothing, numerous differences between the two types of clothing have also been observed which led associated professor Youngsoo Chang from the Department of Cultural Properties in Gyeongju University in 2020 to suggest that the theory about Scythian clothing being the archetype of the ancient , a theory accepted as common knowledge in Korean academia, having to be revised. It is also important to note that the Goguryeo tomb murals were primarily painted in two geographical regions: Ji'an and Pyeongyang. The former is the second capital of Goguryeo while the latter is the third capital of Goguryeo from the mid-fourth to the mid-seventh centuries. While the mural paintings found in regions Ji'an typically shows the characteristics of Goguryeo people in terms of their customs and morals; those from the regions of Pyeongyang typically show the cultural influences of the Han dynasty as the Han dynasty had governed this geographical region for approximately 400 years, including Chinese-style clothing.

Goguryeo 
Early forms of  can be seen in the art of Goguryeo tomb murals in the same period from the 4th to 6th century AD. Trousers, long jackets and twii (a sash-like belt) were worn by both men and women. Women wore skirts on top of their trousers. These basic structural and features of hanbok remain relatively unchanged to this day, except for the length and the ways the jeogori opening was closed as over the years. The jeogori opening was initially closed at the center front of the clothing, similar to a kaftan or closed to the left, before closing to the right side eventually became mainstream. Since the sixth century AD, the closing of the jeogori at the right became a standard practice. The length of the female jeogori also varied. For example, women's jeogori seen in Goguryeo paintings of the late 5th century AD are depicted shorter in length than the man's jeogori.

In early Goguryeo, the jeogori jackets were hip-length Kaftan tunics belted at the waist, and the po overcoats were full body-length Kaftan robes also belted at the waist. The pants were roomy, bearing close similarities to the pants found at Xiongnu burial site of Noin Ula. Some Goguryeo aristocrats wore roomy pants with tighter bindings at the ankle than others, which may have been status symbols along with length, cloth material, and colour. Women sometimes wore pants or otherwise wore pleated skirts. They sometimes wore pants underneath their skirts.

Two types of hwa (shoes) were used, one covering only the foot, and the other covering up to the lower knee.

During this period, conical hat and its similar variants, sometimes adorned with long bird feathers, were worn as headgear. Bird feather ornaments, and bird and tree motifs of golden crowns, are thought to be symbolic connections to the sky.

The Goguryeo period royal attire was known as ochaebok. The precursor of what is now known as the durumagi was introduced during the Goguryeo period from a long coat worn by Northern Chinese. Originally the durumagi was worn by the upper class of Goguryeo for various ceremonies and rituals. It was later modified and worn by the general population. In Muyong-chong murals of Goguryeo, there are male dancers in short jeogori with long flexible sleeves and female dancers wearing long coats with long flexible sleeves, all performing a dance. This type of long sleeves, similar to the Chinese water-sleeves, was passed down to Goryeo, Joseon, and present day Korean court dances and mu-ism rituals.

North-South States period 
In the North-South States Period (698–926 AD), Silla and Balhae adopted dallyeong, a circular-collar robe from the Tang dynasty of China. In Silla, the dallyeong was introduced by Muyeol of Silla in the second year of queen Jindeok of Silla. The dallyeong style from China was used as gwanbok, a formal attire for government officials, grooms, and dragon robe, a formal attire for royalty until the end of Joseon.

United Silla 
The Silla Kingdom unified the Three Kingdoms in 668 AD. The Unified Silla (668-935 AD) was the golden age of Korea. In Unified Silla, various silks, linens, and fashions were imported from Tang China and Persia. In the process, the latest fashions trend of Luoyang which included Chinese dress styles, the second capital of Tang, were also introduced to Korea, where the Korean silhouette became similar to the Western Empire silhouette. King Muyeol of Silla personally travelled to the Tang dynasty to voluntarily request for clothes and belts; it is however difficult to determine which specific form and type of clothing was bestowed although Silla requested the bokdu (幞頭; a form of hempen hood during this period), danryunpo (團領袍; round collar gown), banbi, baedang (䘯襠), and pyo (褾). Based on archaeological findings, it is assumed that the clothing which was brought back during Queen Jindeok rule are danryunpo and bokdu. The bokdu also become part of the official dress code of royal aristocrats, court musicians, servants, and slaves during the reign of Queen Jindeok; it continued to be used throughout the Goryeo dynasty. In 664 AD, Munmu of Silla decreed that the costume of the queen should resemble the costume of the Tang dynasty; and thus, women's costume also accepted the costume culture of the Tang dynasty. Women also sought to imitate the clothing of the Tang dynasty through the adoption of shoulder straps attached to their skirts and wore the skirts over the jeogori. The influence of the Tang dynasty during this time was significant and the Tang court dress regulations were adopted in the Silla court. The clothing of the Tang dynasty introduced in Silla made the clothing attire of Silla Court extravagant, and due to the extravagance, King Heundeog enforced clothing prohibition during the year 834 AD. The general public of Silla continued to wear their own traditional clothing.

Balhae 
Balhae (698–926 AD) imported many various kinds of silk and cotton cloth from the Tang and diverse items from Japan including silk products and ramie. In exchange, Balhae would export fur and leather. The clothing culture of Balhae was heterogeneous; it was not only influenced by the Tang dynasty but also had inherited Goguryeo and indigenous Mohe people elements. Early Balhae officials wore clothing appeared to continue the Three Kingdoms period tradition. However, after Mun of Balhae, Balhae started to incorporate elements from the Tang dynasty, which include the putou and round collared gown for its official attire. Male everyday clothing was similar to Gogoryeo clothing in terms of its headgear; i.e. hemp or conical hats with bird feathers; they also wore leather shoes and belts. Women clothing appears to have adopted clothing from Tang dynasty (i.e. upper garment with long sleeves which is partially covered by a long skirts and shoes with curled tips to facilitate walking) but also wore the ungyeon (Yunjuan; a silk shawl) which started to appear after the demise of the Tang dynasty. The Ungyeon use is unique to late Balhae period and is distinctive from the shawl which was worn by the women of the Tang dynasty. People from Balhae also wore fish-skin skirts and sea leopard leather top to keep warm.

Goryeo dynasty 
The Chinese style imported in the Northern-South period, however, did not affect  still used by the commoners, In the following Goryeo period, use of the Chinese Tang dynasty style of wearing the skirt over the top started to fade, and the wearing of top over skirt was revived in the aristocrat class. The way of wearing the top under the chima (Tang-style influenced fashion) did not disappear in Goryeo and continued to coexist with the indigenous style of wearing of the top over skirt throughout the entire Goryeo dynasty; this Tang-style influenced fashion continued to be worn until the early Joseon dynasty and only disappeared in the middle and late Joseon periods.

In Goryeo Buddhist paintings, the clothing and headwear of royalty and nobles typically follows the clothing system of the Song dynasty. The Goryeo painting "Water-Moon Avalokiteshvara", for example, is a Buddhist painting which was derived from both Chinese and Central Asian pictorial references. On the other hand, the Chinese clothing worn in Yuan dynasty rarely appeared in paintings of Goryeo. The Song dynasty system was later exclusively used by Goryeo Kings and Goryeo government officials after the period when Goryeo was under Mongol rule (1270 –1356). However, even in the Buddhist painting of the late Goryeo, such as the Royal Palace Mandala, the courting ladies are depicted in Tang and Song dynasty-style court dress clothing, which is a different style from the Mongol Yuan court.

Hanbok went through significant changes under Mongol rule. After the Goryeo dynasty signed a peace treaty with the Mongol Empire in the 13th century, Mongolian princesses who married into the Korean royal house brought with them Mongolian fashion which began to prevail in both formal and private life. A total of seven women from the Yuan imperial family were married to the Kings of Goryeo. The Yuan dynasty princess followed the Mongol lifestyle who was instructed to not abandon the Yuan traditions in regards to clothing and precedents. As a consequence, the clothing of Yuan was worn in the Goryeo court and impacted the clothing worn by the upper-class families who visited the Goryeo court. The Yuan clothing culture which influenced the upper classes and in some extent the general public is called Mongolpung. King Chungryeol, who was political hostage to the Yuan dynasty and pro-Yuan, married the princess of Yuan announcing a royal edict to change into Mongol clothing. After the fall of the Yuan dynasty, only Mongol clothing which were beneficial and suitable to Goryeo culture were maintained while the others disappeared. As a result of the Mongol influence, the chima skirt was shortened, and jeogori was hiked up above the waist and tied at the chest with a long, wide ribbon, the g (an extending ribbon tied on the right side) instead of the twii (i.e. the early sash-like belt) and the sleeves were curved slightly.

The cultural exchange was also bilateral and Goryeo had cultural influence on the Mongols court of the Yuan dynasty (1279–1368); one example is the influence of Goryeo women's hanbok on the attire of aristocrats, queens, and concubines of the Mongol court which occurred in the capital city, Khanbaliq. However, this influence on the Mongol court clothing mainly occurred in the last years of the Yuan dynasty. Throughout the Yuan dynasty, many people from Goryeo were forced to move into the Yuan; most of them were kongnyo (literally translated as "tribute women"), eunuchs, and war prisoners. About 2000 women from Goryeo were sent to Yuan as kongnyo against their will. Although women from Goryeo were considered very beautiful and good servants, most of them lived in unfortunate situations, marked by hard labour and sexual abuse. However, this fate was not reserved to all of them; and one Goryeo woman became the last Empress of the Yuan dynasty; this was Empress Gi who was elevated as empress in 1365. Most of the cultural influence that Goryeo exerted on the upper class of the Yuan dynasty occurred when Empress Gi came into power as empress and started to recruit many Goryeo women as court maids. The influence of Goryeo on the Mongol court's clothing during the Yuan dynasty was dubbed as Goryeoyang ("the Goryeo style") and was rhapsodized by the Late Yuan dynasty poet, Zhang Xu, in the form of a short banbi (半臂) with square collar (方領). However, so far, the modern interpretation on the appearance of Mongol royal women's clothing influenced by Goryeo is based on authors' suggestions. According to Hyunhee Park: "Like the Mongolian style, it is possible that this Koryŏ style [Koryŏ yang] continued to influence some Chinese in the Ming period after the Ming dynasty replaced the Yuan dynasty, a topic to investigate further." According to the 高麗史·舆服志, the Goryeo costume system inherited the costume system of the Tang Dynasty. The half arm was developed from the half sleeves in the Han and Wei Dynasties. In the Sui and Tang Dynasties, the half arm became a fashionable dress for women. In the Tang Dynasty, half-arms were worn on top of the coat, or under the coat and on top of the mid-single. With the lower skirt, the half-arm shirt appeared in the form of a placket. The half arm of the Tang Dynasty spread to the Korean peninsula, and continued to be inherited and developed during the Goryeo Dynasty, becoming an important costume of the Goryeo Dynasty.

Joseon dynasty

Neo-Confucianism as the ruling ideology in Joseon was established by the early Joseon dynasty kings; this led to the dictation of clothing style worn by all social classes in Joseon (including the dress of the royals, the court members, the aristocrats and commoners) in all types of occasions, which included wedding and funerals. Social values such as the integrity in men and chastity in women were also reflected in how people would dress. After the Japanese invasions of Korea (1592–98) or Imjin War, economic hardship on the peninsula may have influenced the closer-fitting styles that use less fabric.

Women's everyday wear 

Early Joseon continued the women's fashion for baggy, loose clothing, such as those seen on the mural from the tomb of Bak Ik (1332–1398); the murals from the tomb of Bak Ik are valuable resources in Korean archaeology and art history for study of life and customs in the early Joseon. The women of the upper classes, the monarchy and the court wore hanbok which was inspired by the Ming dynasty clothing while simultaneously maintaining a distinctive Korean-style look; in turn, the women of the lower class generally imitated the upper-class women clothing. During the Joseon dynasty, the chima or skirt adopted fuller volume, while the jeogori or blouse took more tightened and shortened form, features quite distinct from the hanbok of previous centuries, when chima was rather slim and jeogori baggy and long, reaching well below waist level.

In the 15th century, neo-confucianism was very rooted in the social life in the fifteenth and sixteenth centuries which lead to the strict regulation of clothing (including fabric use, colours of fabric, motifs, and ornaments) based on status. Neo-confucianism also influence women's wearing of full-pleated chima, longer jeogori, and multiple layers clothing in order to never reveal skin. In the 15th century, women started wearing of full-pleated chima which completely hide the body lines and longer-length jeogori. The 15th century AD chima-jeogori style was undoubtedly a clothing style introduced from China consisting of longer jeogori and pleated chima.However, by the 16th century, the  had shortened to the waist and appears to have become closer fitting, although not to the extremes of the bell-shaped silhouette of the 18th and 19th centuries. In the 16th century, women's  was long, wide, and covered the waist. The length of women's  gradually shortened: it was approximately 65 cm in the 16th century, 55 cm in the 17th century, 45 cm in the 18th century, and 28 cm in the 19th century, with some as short as 14.5 cm. The trend of wearing a short jeogori with a heoritti was started by the gisaeng and soon spread to women of the upper class. Among women of the common and lowborn classes, a practice emerged in which they revealed their breasts by removing a cloth to make breastfeeding more convenient. As there was an excessive preference for boys in the Joseon dynasty, the deliberate exposure of breast eventually became a cultural practice and an indicator of women's pride and status symbol in having given birth to a son and thus she would "proudly bare her breasts to feed her child, deliberately provoking the envy of other women". During the 17th and 18th centuries the fullness of the skirt was concentrated around the hips, thus forming a silhouette similar to Western bustles. In the 18th century, the jeogori became very short to the point that the waistband of the chima was visible; this style was first seen on female entertainers at the Joseon court. The jeogori continued to shorten until it reached the modern times jeogori-length; i.e. just covering the breasts. The fullness of the skirt reached its extreme around 1800. During the 19th century fullness of the skirt was achieved around the knees and ankles thus giving chima a triangular or an A-shaped silhouette, which is still the preferred style to this day. Many undergarments such as darisokgot, soksokgot, dansokgot, and gojengi were worn underneath to achieve desired forms.

At the end of the 19th century, as mentioned above, Heungseon Daewongun introduced magoja, a Manchu-style jacket, which is often worn over jeogori to this day.

A clothes reformation movement aimed at lengthening  experienced wide success in the early 20th century and has continued to influence the shaping of modern hanbok. Modern  are longer, although still halfway between the waistline and the breasts. Heoritti are sometimes exposed for aesthetic reasons.

Men's everyday wear 
Men's hanbok saw little change compared to women's hanbok. The form and design of jeogori and baji hardly changed.

In contrast, men's lengthy outwear, the equivalent of the modern overcoat, underwent a dramatic change. Before the late 19th century, yangban men almost always wore jungchimak when traveling. Jungchimak had very lengthy sleeves, and its lower part had splits on both sides and occasionally on the back so as to create a fluttering effect in motion. To some this was fashionable, but to others, namely stoic scholars, it was nothing but pure vanity. Daewon-gun successfully banned jungchimak as a part of his clothes reformation program and jungchimak eventually disappeared.

Durumagi, which was previously worn underneath jungchimak and was basically a house dress, replaced jungchimak as the formal outwear for yangban men. Durumagi differs from its predecessor in that it has tighter sleeves and does not have splits on either sides or back. It is also slightly shorter in length. Men's hanbok has remained relatively the same since the adoption of durumagi. In 1884, the Gapsin Dress Reform took place. Under the 1884's decree of King Gojong, only narrow-sleeves traditional overcoat were permitted; as such, all Koreans, regardless of their social class, their age and their gender started to wear the durumagi or chaksuui or ju-ui (周衣).

Hats was an essential part formal dress and the development of official hats became even more pronounced during this era due to the emphasis of Confucian values. The gat was considered an essential aspect in a man's life; however, to replace the gat in more informal setting, such as their residences, and to feel more comfortable, Joseon-era aristocrats also adopted a lot hats which were introduced from China, such as the banggwan, sabanggwan, dongpagwan, waryonggwan, jeongjagwan. The popularity of those Chinese hats may have partially been due to the promulgation of Confucianism and because they were used by literary figures and scholars in China. In 1895, King Gojong decreed adult Korean men to cut their hair short and western-style clothing were allowed and adopted.

Material and color

The upper classes wore hanbok of closely woven ramie cloth or other high-grade lightweight materials in warm weather and of plain and patterned silks the rest of the year. Commoners were restricted by law as well as resources to cotton at best.

The upper classes wore a variety of colors, though bright colors were generally worn by children and girls and subdued colors by middle-aged men and women. Commoners were restricted by law to everyday clothes of white, but for special occasions they wore dull shades of pale pink, light green, gray, and charcoal. The color of chima showed the wearer's social position and statement. For example, a navy color indicated that a woman had son(s). Only the royal family could wear clothing with geumbak-printed patterns (gold leaf) on the bottom of the chima.

Headdresses

Both male and female wore their hair in a long braid until they were married, at which time the hair was knotted; man's hair was knotted in a topknot called sangtu (상투) on the top of the head, and the woman's hair was rolled into a ball shaped form or komeori and was set just above the nape of the neck.

A long pin, or binyeo (비녀), was worn in women's knotted hair as both a fastener and a decoration. The material and length of the binyeo varied according to the wearer's class and status. And also wore a ribbon or daenggi (댕기) to tie and to decorate braided hair. Women wore a jokduri on their wedding day and wore an ayam for protection from the cold. Men wore a gat, which varied according to class and status.

Before the 19th century, women of high social backgrounds and gisaeng wore wigs (gache). Like their Western counterparts, Koreans considered bigger and heavier wigs to be more desirable and aesthetic. Such was the women's frenzy for the gache that in 1788 King Jeongjo banned by royal decree the use of gache, as they were deemed contrary to the Korean Confucian values of reserve and restraint.

Owing to the influence of Neo-Confucianism, it was compulsory for women throughout the entire society to wear headdresses (nae-oe-seugae) to avoid exposing their faces when going outside; those headdresses may include suegaechima (a headdress which looked like a chima but was narrower and shorter in style worn by the upper-class women and later by all classes of people in late Joseon), the jang-ot, and the neoul (which was only permitted for court ladies and noblewomen).

In the 19th century yangban women began to wear jokduri, a small hat that replaced gache. However gache enjoyed vast popularity in kisaeng circles well into the end of the century.

Later development
Today's hanbok is the direct descendant of hanbok patterned after those worn by the aristocratic women or by the people who were at least from the middle-class in the Joseon period, specifically the late 19th century. Hanbok had gone through various changes and fashion fads during the five hundred years under the reigns of Joseon kings and eventually evolved to what we now mostly consider typical hanbok.

Beginning in the late 19th century, hanbok was largely replaced by new Western imports like the Western suit and dress. Today, formal and casual wear are usually based on Western styles. However, hanbok is still worn for traditional occasions, and is reserved for celebrations like weddings, the Lunar New Year, annual ancestral rites, or the birth of a child.

Modern usage
 has been featured in international haute couture; on the catwalk, in 2015 when Karl Lagerfield dressed Korean models for Chanel, and during Paris Fashion Week in photography by Phil Oh. It has also been worn by international celebrities, such as Britney Spears and Jessica Alba, and athletes, such as tennis player Venus Williams and football player Hines Ward.

Hanbok is also popular among Asian-American celebrities, such as Lisa Ling and Miss Asia 2014, Eriko Lee Katayama. It has also made appearances on the red carpet, and was worn by Sandra Oh at the SAG Awards, and by Sandra Oh's mother who made fashion history in 2018 for wearing a hanbok to the Emmy Awards.

South Korea 
The South Korean government has supported the resurgence of interest in hanbok by sponsoring fashion designers. Domestically, hanbok has become trendy in street fashion and music videos. It has been worn by the prominent K-pop artists like Blackpink and BTS, notably in their music videos for "How You Like That" and "Idol."

In Seoul, a tourist's wearing of hanbok makes their visit to the Five Grand Palaces (Changdeokgung, Changgyeonggung, Deoksugung, Gyeongbokgung and Gyeonghuigung) free of charge.

North Korea 

The  thus highlights the identity of the Korean ethnic and has been more actively promoted under the rule of Kim Jong-Un. The  is currently typically worn during special occasions, e.g. weddings, and when North Koreans celebrate the 60th, 70th, and 80th birthdays of their parents. It is also mandated that women wear  when attending National events, such as Kim Jong-il's birthday (February 16), International women's day (March 8), Kim Il-Sung's birthday (April 15), Foundation Day (September 9). White coloured hanbok is often used as the colour white has been the traditionally favoured by the Korean people as the symbolism of pure spirit.

The  remains the clothing of women, including female university students who are required to wear it as part of their university school uniforms. The uniform of female university students is a black-and-white  since the early to mid 2000s. The  can often be found about 30 cm from the ground-level for practice purposes in order to facilitate movements and ensure that women could wear it on their daily workday with ease and comfort; this decrease in skirt length also gives a sense of modern style.

The  patterns also have special meanings, which are given by the North Koreans. Generally, young people in North Korea likes floral prints and bright colours, while the older generations favours simple styles of clothing and solid colours. Azalaes, in particular, are well-favoured in Yongbyon due to its association with an emotional poem Azaleas《》by Kim So-wol. Men occasionally wore .

However,  are typically more expensive than ordinary clothing, and renting is available for people cannot afford to purchase one; some are available for purchase at US$20 while the  made in China with South Korean designs and fabrics are more expensive and can cost approximately US$3000.

History 
The 1950s and 1960s also saw women from the upper-class wore  made out of rayon while a black-and-white  consisting of a black long-length  and white  were used in the 1950s and 1960s where it was generally worn by women; this style can, however, be traced to a typical clothing style used in the Joseon dynasty period. This combination is still representative of the ideal woman and remains the official outfit for women in North Korea to this day. In the 1980s, the  became the official attire of women when attending ceremonies while western-style clothing became the everyday, ordinary clothing.

After the mid-1990s due to extreme econooic contractions, women can purchase their  in private markers and are allowed to choose their desired colours and designs.

In 2001, Lee Young-Hee, a South Korean  designer visited Pyeongyang to hold fashion at the Pyeongyang Youth Center on June 4 and 6; and since the 2002, North Korea have held their own fashion show in Pyeongyang every spring. These shops are typically found in large cities, such as Pyeongyang and Gaesong but are rarely found in small cities and villages.

modern usage of Korean diaspora

China 

The  is an official term and is recognized as one of the official 55 ethnic minority in China; people from  ethnic are not recent immigrants in China but have a long history having lived in China for generations. They share the same ethnic identity as the Korean ethnic in both Northern and Southern Korea but are counted as Chinese citizens by nationality under the Constitution of China. Their traditions are not entirely the same due to their unique historical experiences, geographical location and mixed identities.

since the Chinese economic reform of China, there have been more exchanges with both Koreas leading to both the development and changes in chaoxianzu-style  in China; some of designs of the chaoxianzu-style  have been influenced and inspired by both South Korean and North Korean  designs.

The  originally preferred to wear white colours as it represented cleanliness, simplicity, and purity; however, since the 20th century, the colours started to become brigher and more vivid and diverse as woven fabrics, such as polyester and nylon sateen, started to be introduced. Following the  tradition, the  has an A-line in silhouette to give it the appearance of a mountain as per the tradition, women are the host of the family, and thus, women holding the household need to be stable; the  also covers the entire body. The  have developed their own style of  due to the isolation for about 50 years from both the North and South Koreas. For example, Yemi Hanbok by Songok Ryu, an ethnic  from the Yanbian Korean Autonomous Prefecture, is unique in both style and business model as it can operate in both South Korea and North Korea. In terms of  design, Yemi Hanbok designs are based on Chinese-style designs. The  and  have evolved from straight to curve patterns. The wrinkle arrangement, length, and silhouette of the  have also evolved; some of the skirts were sometimes decorated with gold embroidery or gold leaf at the bottom hem. The colours used were also very varied; for example, feminine colours such as pink, yellow, and deep red could be used. The 1990s saw the use of gold leaf, floral prints, embroidery on the women's ; the use of gradient colours also emerged.

Social status
Especially from the Goryeo Dynasty, the hanbok started to determine differences in social status (from people with the highest social status (kings), to those of the lowest social status (slaves)) and gender through the many types, components, colours, and characteristics. Although the modern Hanbok does not express a person's status or social position, Hanbok was an important element of distinguishment especially in the Goryeo and Joseon dynasties. For example, farmers and commoners were not allowed to wear colour garments in their daily lives, excluding some categories of people, such as the shamans, gisaeng, and children, who were allowed to wear colourful clothing despite their social status. Occasions when all people were allowed to wear colourful clothing were for special ceremonial occasions (e.g. wedding, birthday, holidays).

Clothes

Each pattern represented a different role within society, for example: a dragon represented an emperor while a phoenix represented a queen; floral patterns represented a princess and a king's daughter by a concubine, and clouds and cranes represented high ranking court officials. All these patterns throughout Korean history had meanings of longevity, good luck, wealth and honor.  also had blue, red, and yellow colored stripes in each sleeve; a woman usually wore a scarlet-colored skirt and yellow or green-colored Jeogori, a traditional Korean jacket.  was worn over the Jeogori and skirt. A woman also wore her hair in a bun, with an ornamental hairpin and a ceremonial coronet. In more recent times, people wear  on their wedding day, and so the Korean tradition survives in the present day.

Wonsam

Wonsam was a ceremonial overcoat for a married woman in the Joseon dynasty. The Wonsam was also adopted from China and is believed to have been one of the costumes from the Tang dynasty which was bestowed in the Unified Three Kingdoms period. It was mostly worn by royalty, high-ranking court ladies, and noblewomen and the colors and patterns represented the various elements of the Korean class system. The empress wore yellow; the queen wore red; the crown princess wore a purple-red color; meanwhile a princess, a king's daughter by a concubine, and a woman of a noble family or lower wore green. All the upper social ranks usually had two colored stripes in each sleeve: yellow-colored Wonsam usually had red and blue colored stripes, red-colored Wonsam had blue and yellow stripes, and green-colored Wonsam had red and yellow stripes. Lower-class women wore many accompanying colored stripes and ribbons, but all women usually completed their outfit with Onhye or Danghye, traditional Korean shoes.

Dangui

Dangui or Tangwi were minor ceremonial robes for the queen, a princess, or wife of a high ranking government official while it was worn during major ceremonies among the noble class in the Joseon dynasty. The materials used to make  varied depending on the season, so upper-class women wore thick  in winter while they wore thinner layers in summer. The  came in many colors, but yellow and/or green were most common. However the emperor wore purple , and the queen wore red. In the Joseon dynasty, ordinary women wore  as part of their wedding dress.

Myeonbok and Jeokui

Myeonbok

Myeonbok were the king's religious and formal ceremonial robes while Jeokui were the queen's equivalent during the Goryeo and Joseon dynasties.  Myeonbok was composed of Myeonryu-Gwan and Gujang-bok. Myonryu-Gwan had beads, which hung loose; these would prevent the king from seeing wickedness. There were also wads of cotton in the left and right sides of Myeonryu-Gwan, and these were supposed to make the king oblivious to the influence of corrupt officials. Gujang-bok was black, and it bore nine symbols out of the Twelve ornaments, which all represented the king.

Nine symbols
 Dragon:A dragon's appearance paralleled how the king governed and subsequently brought balance to the world.
 Fire: The king was expected to be intelligent and wise to govern the people effectively, like a guiding light represented by the fire.
 Pheasant: The image of a pheasant represented magnificence.
 Mountain: As a mountain is high, the king was on a par in terms of status and was deserving of respect and worship.
 Tiger: A tiger represented the king's courage.
 Monkey: A monkey symbolized wisdom.
 Rice: As the people needed rice to live, the king was compared to this foodstuff as he had the responsibility of protecting their welfare.
 Axe: This indicated that the king had the ability to save and take lives.
 Water plant: Another depiction of the king's magnificence.

Jeokui

Jeokui or Tseogwi was arranged through the use of different colors as a status symbol within the royal family.  The empress wore purple-red colored Jeokui, the queen wore pink, and the crown princess wore deep blue.  "Jeok" means pheasant, and so Jeokui often had depictions of pheasants embroidered onto it.

Cheolique
Cheolique (Alt. Cheolick or Cheollik) (Hangul: 철릭) was a Korean adaptation of the Mongol tunic, imported in the late 1200s during the Goryeo dynasty. Cheolique, unlike other forms of Korean clothing, is an amalgamation of a blouse with a kilt into a single item of clothing. The flexibility of the clothing allowed easy horsemanship and archery. During the Joseon dynasty, they continued to be worn by the king, and military officials for such activities. It was usually worn as a military uniform, but by the end of the Joseon dynasty, it had begun to be worn in more casual situations. A unique characteristic allowed the detachment of the Cheolique's sleeves which could be used as a bandage if the wearer was injured in combat.

Ayngsam
Ayngsam was the formal clothing for students during the national government exam and governmental ceremonies. It was typically yellow, but for the student who scored the highest in the exam, they were rewarded with the ability to wear green Aengsam. If the highest-scoring student was young, the king awarded him with red-colored Aengsam. It was similar to the namsam but with a different colour.

Accessories

Binyeo 

Binyeo or Pinyeo (Hangul: 비녀) was a traditional ornamental hairpin, and it had a different-shaped tip again depending on social status. As a result, it was possible to determine the social status of the person by looking at the binyeo. Women in the royal family had dragon or phoenix-shaped Binyeo while ordinary women had trees or Japanese apricot flowers. And Binyeo was a proof of marriage. Therefore, to a woman, Binyeo was an expression of chastity and decency.

Daenggi
Daenggi is a traditional Korean ribbon made of cloth to tie and to decorate braided hair.

Norigae

Norigae (Hangul: 노리개) was a typical traditional accessory for women; it was worn by all women regardless of social ranks. However, the social rank of the wearer determined the different sizes and materials of the norigae.

Danghye
Danghye or Tanghye (Hangul: 당혜) were shoes for married women in the Joseon dynasty.  Danghye were decorated with trees bearing grapes, pomegranates, chrysanthemums, or peonies: these were symbols of longevity.

Kunghye
Danghye for a woman in the royal family were known as Kunghye (Hangul: 궁혜), and they were usually patterned with flowers.

Onhye
Danghye for an ordinary woman were known as Onhye (Hangul: 온혜).

See also 

List of Korean clothing
Hanfu - a Chinese equivalent. 
Việt phục - a Vietnamese equivalent. 
Wafuku - a Japanese equivalent.

Notes

Footnotes

References

 An, Myung Sook (안명숙); Kim, Yong Ser (김용서)  1998. Hanʼguk poksiksa (한국복식사). Seoul. Yehaksa (예학사) 
 Kim, Ki Sun (김기선).  2005.  Information about Mongolian pigtail 몽골의 辮髮에 대하여. The Institute of Asian Ethno-Forms and Culture. v. 5, 81-97
 Kim, Moon Ja , 2004. A study on the Source of Hanbok in ancient times and the position of Hanbok on the Globalism  (고대 한복의 원류 및 세계화 속의 한복의 위치), Society of Korean Traditional Costume, v. 7.1, 7-15
 Lee, Kyung-Ja (이경자) , 2003, Uri ot ŭi chŏnt'ong yangsik (우리옷의 전통양식 The Traditional Style of Korean Clothes) Ewha Womans University Press. 

 McCallion, Aleasha; Condra, Jill. 2008. The Greenwood Encyclopedia of Clothing Through World History. Greenwood Publishing Group. p. 221 - 228, 
 Nelson, Sarah. 1993. The archaeology of Korea. Cambridge University Press. 
 You, Soon Lye (유순례)  2006, Comparative Research on the Costume Aesthetic Korean & Mongolia (몽골과 한국의 전통복식 미의식 비교에 대한 연구), Society of Korean Traditional Costume, v. 6, 183-185

External links

 Hanbok History Evolution
 Hanbok History Infographic
 History of Hanbok 
 Information about Hanbok 
 Traditional Korean Clothing - Life in Korea
 Official Korea Tourism Organization - Hanbok Clothing 

Korean culture
Korean clothing
Folk costumes